The 2005 Independence Bowl, the 30th in the history of the College Football bowl game,  saw the Missouri Tigers of the Big 12 overcome a 21–0 deficit late in the first quarter to defeat the SEC's South Carolina Gamecocks, 38–31 in the 30th edition of the bowl game.  Quarterback Brad Smith and cornerback Marcus King, both of Missouri, were named the offensive and defensive players of the game.

References

Independence Bowl
Independence Bowl
South Carolina Gamecocks football bowl games
Missouri Tigers football bowl games
Independence Bowl
December 2005 sports events in the United States